Gus Schumacher, born August Schumacher Jr., was Vice-President of Policy at the Wholesome Wave Foundation in Bridgeport, Connecticut. He was also a member of the 21st Century Sustainable Agricultural Task Force of the National Academy of Sciences. In 2007, Schumacher, along with Professor Robert Thompson, Gardner Professor of Agricultural Economics at Illinois, oversaw the preparation of the Task Force Report of the Chicago Council on Global Affairs, titled “Modernizing America’s Food and Farm Policy: Vision for a New Direction” (2006).

Childhood
Schumacher was born in Lincoln, Massachusetts, on 4 December 1939.  He grew up on a farm near Lexington, Massachusetts.

Career
Schumacher was a Consultant to the Food and Society Initiative at the W.K. Kellogg Foundation in Battle Creek, Michigan. He also directed the Washington operations of SJH and Company of Boston, Massachusetts, an agri-strategy firm, and served as the Contributing Agricultural Editor of Food Arts magazine

As former Under Secretary of Agriculture for Farm and Foreign Agricultural Services at the United States Department of Agriculture from 1997 to 2001, Schumacher oversaw the Farm Service Agency, the Foreign Agricultural Service, and the Risk Management Agency. He was also President of the Commodity Credit Corporation.

Prior to that appointment, Schumacher served as Administrator of USDA's Foreign Agricultural Service, worked as a senior agri-lender for the World Bank, and served as Commissioner of Food and Agriculture for the Commonwealth of Massachusetts.

Schumacher was Vice President of Policy of the Wholesome Wave Foundation of Westport, Connecticut, served on the boards of  FreshFarm Markets in Washington DC, the Environmental Power Corporation, Tarrytown, New York, GrainPro, LLC of Concord, Massachusetts and Sustainable CAPE of Truro, Massachusetts.

On September 22, 2008, he was selected for the 20th Anniversary Food Arts award for outstanding service to the American food and farming system at a ceremony in New York City. In 2013 Schumacher received a Leadership Award from the James Beard Foundation.

Schumacher died September 24, 2017, in Washington, D.C., of an apparent heart attack.

Wholesome Wave Foundation
Schumacher met Michel Nischan with Food Arts Publisher Michael Batterberry, who introduced the two men. They both had common interests in local, healthful food sources and the expanding work of new refugee farmers in New England growing unique Asian vegetables. Schumacher and Nischan soon began visiting these new growers and started links between New York City, Boston, and Washington, DC restaurants to source vegetables from the refugee farmers for local chefs’ menus.

This work evolved, culminating in the formation of Wholesome Wave Foundation as a way to link other local farmers around the country to supply healthy, sustainably grown produce at farmers’ markets to under-served neighborhoods. Wholesome Wave’s “double voucher” program aimed to provide greater food access for vulnerable families dependent on SNAP (food stamp), WIC and Social Security Income.

Education
Schumacher earned a degree in economics from Harvard College, studied at the London School of Economics and was a research associate in agribusiness at the Harvard Business School, where he worked with Professor Ray A. Goldberg.

References

External links 
 
 The Wholesome Wave Foundation, 
 The W.K. Kellogg Foundation, 
 International Institute for Agriculture Risk Management, 

United States Department of Agriculture officials
World Bank people
Heads of the Foreign Agricultural Service
Harvard College alumni
Alumni of the London School of Economics
People from Lincoln, Massachusetts
1939 births
2017 deaths